Alfredo Hugo Rojas Delinge, nicknamed El Tanque (born 20 February 1937 in Lanús, Buenos Aires Province) is a former professional Argentine football player.

Biography 
Rojas started playing with Club Atlético Lanús in 1958, but his participation in the 1958 FIFA World Cup opened him a door to Europe. He joined Celta de Vigo in mid-1959, but the club was relegated, Rojas moved on to play for Real Betis in 1959.

Alfredo Rojas returned to Argentina after signing for River Plate, but he spent most of the time sitting on the bench. It was not until 1962, when he move to Club de Gimnasia y Esgrima La Plata, that El Tanque gained some importance in the Argentine football, scoring 17 goals. After another season with the team from La Plata, Rojas was transferred to Boca Juniors.

Nicknamed El Tanque ("the tank") Rojas played four seasons with Boca Juniors, winning the 1965 Argentine Championship, and becoming one of the most important and beloved Boca players of the 1960s. From 1964 to 1968 he played 102 league matches, scoring 46 goals.

In 1968 Boca Juniors gave Rojas a free transfer to move to Chilean Universidad Católica, where he ended his career.

With the Argentina national team, Rojas played in the 1958 and 1966 FIFA World Cup, and won the 1964 Taça das Nações (Nations Cup).

Titles
Boca Juniors
 Primera División (1): 1965
Argentina
 Taça das Nações (1): 1964

References

External links
 
 Alfredo Rojas with Boca Juniors (Spanish)

1937 births
Living people
Argentine footballers
Argentine expatriate footballers
Argentina international footballers
Argentine Primera División players
Club Atlético Lanús footballers
Club Atlético River Plate footballers
Boca Juniors footballers
Club de Gimnasia y Esgrima La Plata footballers
La Liga players
Atlético Madrid footballers
RC Celta de Vigo players
Real Betis players
Peñarol players
O'Higgins F.C. footballers
Club Deportivo Universidad Católica footballers
1958 FIFA World Cup players
1966 FIFA World Cup players
Expatriate footballers in Chile
Expatriate footballers in Spain
Expatriate footballers in Uruguay
Sportspeople from Lanús
Association football forwards